Area codes 708 and 464 are telephone area codes in the North American Numbering Plan (NANP) for the southern and western suburbs 
of Chicago in the U.S. state of Illinois. The numbering plan area comprises most of western and southern Cook County, and eastern and southern Will County.

Area code 708 was created on November 11, 1989, in a split of area code 312. It once served almost all of Chicago's suburbs in Illinois. In 1996, its numbering plan area was reduced in a three-way area code split. The northern suburbs received area code 847, while the western suburbs were assigned area code 630. Area code 708 was Illinois' first new area code since 309 had been created in 1957, and the second new code for the state since the announcement of the original North American area codes in 1947, when the state was divided into four numbering plan areas (217, 312, 618, and 815).

The Illinois side of the Chicago area–312/773/872, 708/464, 847/224, 630/331, and portions of 815/779–is one of the largest local calling areas in the United States; with few exceptions, no long-distance charges are levied from one portion of the metro area to another.

Prior to October 2021, area code 708 had telephone numbers assigned for the central office code 988. In 2020, 988 was designated nationwide as a dialing code for the National Suicide Prevention Lifeline, which created a conflict for exchanges that permit seven-digit dialing. This area code was therefore scheduled to transition to ten-digit dialing by October 24, 2021.

On June 30, 1999, area code 464 was reserved for future relief in 708. Implementation was held off for over two decades until it became clear in 2021 that relief would be necessary. Area code 464 went into effect on January 21, 2022.

Service area

Sixty cities are included in this plan:
Alsip
Beecher
Bellwood
Berwyn
Blue Island
Bridgeview
Broadview
Burbank
Calumet City
Chicago Heights
Chicago Ridge
Cicero
Country Club Hills
Crest Hill
Crete
Dolton
Elmwood Park
Evergreen Park
Flossmoor
Forest Park
Glenwood
Harvey
Harwood Heights
Hazel Crest
Hickory Hills
Homer Glen
Homewood
Justice
La Grange
Lansing
Lyons
Markham
Matteson
Maywood
Melrose Park
Midlothian
Mokena
Monee
Norridge
Northlake
Oak Forest
Oak Lawn
Oak Park
Olympia Fields
Orland Park
Palos Hills
Palos Park
Park Forest
Peotone
Richton Park
River Forest
River Grove
Riverdale
South Holland
Steger
Tinley Park
University Park
Westchester
Western Springs
Worth

See also
 List of NANP area codes
 List of Illinois area codes

References

External links
Map of Illinois area codes at North American Numbering Plan Administration's website
 List of exchanges from AreaCodeDownload.com, 708 Area Code

708
708
Telecommunications-related introductions in 1989